Bundoran railway station served Bundoran in  County Donegal in the Republic of Ireland.

The Enniskillen and Bundoran Railway opened the station on 13 June 1866. Services were provided by the Irish North Western Railway. It was taken over by the Great Northern Railway (Ireland) in 1876.

During The Emergency of 1939–45 the GNR introduced the Bundoran Express that linked Dublin and Bundoran via  and Enniskillen. It also carried pilgrims to and from Pettigo, which was the nearest station for Lough Derg. There were also through trains between Bundoran and Belfast.

The partition of Ireland in 1922 turned the boundary with County Fermanagh into an international frontier. Henceforth Bundoran's only railway link with the rest of the Irish Free State was via Northern Ireland, and as such was subject to delays for customs inspections. The Government of Northern Ireland closed much of the GNR network on its side of the border in 1957, including the E&BR as far as the border. This gave the Republic no practical alternative but to allow the closure of the line between the border and Bundoran. It officially closed on 1 October 1957.

Routes

References

1866 establishments in Ireland
1957 disestablishments in Ireland
Railway Station
Disused railway stations in County Donegal
Railway stations closed in 1957
Railway stations opened in 1866
Railway stations in Northern Ireland opened in the 19th century